There Goes the Neighborhood is the fifth solo studio album by the American singer-songwriter and multi-instrumentalist Joe Walsh, sometime-guitarist for the Eagles. The album was released in May 1981, by Asylum Records, three years after Walsh's album But Seriously, Folks... (1978).

The album features contributions from two Eagles' members Don Felder and Timothy B. Schmit as well as session musicians including Russ Kunkel, David Lindley, Bob Mayo, and Victor Feldman.

The album peaked at No. 20 on the Billboard 200. The album only spawned one charting single, "A Life of Illusion", which would become one of Walsh's most popular songs and reached No. 34 at on the Billboard Hot 100. The single also topped the Hot Mainstream Rock Tracks chart.

Cover artwork
The cover art for the album features Walsh leaning, while at the top of an American tank with rubble around him. Additionally, the single release of the song "A Life of Illusion" used the same image of Walsh. The promotional video for the track shows the coming to life of the album's cover.

Background
"A Life of Illusion" was recorded in 1973 with Joe Walsh's first solo band Barnstorm but was not completed. The overdubs and final mixes were completed during the There Goes the Neighborhood sessions and released on the album. This song also appeared in the opening credits of The 40-Year-Old Virgin (2005) and appears as the first song on its soundtrack.

Another track "Rivers (Of the Hidden Funk)" was a track Walsh wrote for the Eagles' sixth studio album The Long Run (1979), but was left off. The track featured a guest appearance by Walsh's Eagles-mate Don Felder (who co-wrote the track) on talk box guitar.

The album's final track "You Never Know" is a song about rumors and hearsay, including not-so-veiled swipes at other members of the Eagles and their management with lines like "The Frontline grapevine jury's in a nasty mood / you might be guilty, honey, you never know." (Frontline Management was Irving Azoff's management firm at the time). Don Felder appears on guitar on this track performing rhythm and dual lead guitar solos with Walsh.

Eagles bandmate Timothy B. Schmit sang backing vocals on the opening track "Things".

Critical reception

Writing retrospectively for AllMusic, critic Ben Davies wrote of the album "Joe Walsh's long and varied career has had its ups and downs, to say the least. Here, you see Walsh in good old rock form... The rock legend's trademark sound is prominently featured throughout the album, and undoubtedly here he performs some of his finest solos. The only qualm that one can pick is that the whole album is in a much-similar vein."

Record World called the single "Made Your Mind Up" a "real toe-tapper [that] features a compelling arrangement."

Track listing
All songs written and composed by Joe Walsh, except where noted.

Personnel 
Musicians
 Joe Walsh – vocals, guitars, acoustic piano (1), synthesizers (1), keyboards (2), jawbone (3), organ (4), noises (7)
 Tom Stephenson – organ (6)
 Don Felder – guitars (4, 8), talk box (4)
 Bob Mayo – 12-string guitar (4)
 Kenny Passarelli – guitarrón (6), trumpet (6)
 George "Chocolate" Perry – bass (1-4, 6, 7, 8), backing vocals (1), percussion (7)
 Joe Vitale – drums, backing vocals (1, 2, 7), tambourine (4), acoustic piano (6)
 Russ Kunkel – triangle (3)
 Victor Feldman – percussion (8)
 David Lindley – violin (3, 6), backing vocals (6)
 Timothy B. Schmit – backing vocals (1)
 Jody Boyer – backing vocals (4, 6, 8)

Production and artwork
 Joe Walsh – producer 
 George "Chocolate" Perry – producer 
 Jim Nipar – recording, mixing 
 James Geddes – recording assistant, mix assistant 
 Mike Reese – mastering 
 Jeff Adamoff – art direction, design 
 Jim Shea – photography 
 Todd Andrews – sleeve photography 
 Irving Azoff – management for Front Line Entertainment 
 Recorded and mixed at Santa Barbara Sound Recording (Santa Barbara, California).
 Mastered at The Mastering Lab (Hollywood, California).

Charts

See also
 List of albums released in 1981
 Joe Walsh's discography

References

External links
 

Joe Walsh albums
1981 albums
Asylum Records albums
Elektra Records albums
Albums produced by Joe Walsh